The Pompeiian Villa is a historic house in Port Arthur, Texas, U.S.. It was built in 1900 for Isaac Ellwood, and designed by architects George C. Nimmons and William K. Fellows. It belonged to James Hopkins, the vice president of the Diamond Match Company, from 1901 to 1903, when it was sold to George Craig for 10% of Texaco. It has been listed on the National Register of Historic Places since May 23, 1973.

The house is owned by the Port Arthur Historical Society, and is open for tours by reservation with the Museum of the Gulf Coast.

See also

National Register of Historic Places listings in Jefferson County, Texas
Recorded Texas Historic Landmarks in Jefferson County

References

Houses on the National Register of Historic Places in Texas
Neoclassical architecture in Texas
Houses completed in 1900
Houses in Jefferson County, Texas
Texaco
Museums in Jefferson County, Texas
Historic house museums in Texas
Port Arthur, Texas